The Driskell–Martin House is a historic house in Plantersville, Dallas County, Alabama.  It is the oldest surviving high style residence in the community.  The two-story wood-frame house was built for Thomas Sanford Driskell, a planter and a merchant from Virginia, in 1850.  The builders were Nelson Mitchell and Massena Godwin.  The house was used as a Union headquarters during the American Civil War.  Their forces occupied it during Wilson's Raid through Alabama in April 1865.  The house remained in the Driskell family until purchased by Dr. Thomas Munroe Martin in 1915.

The Greek Revival-style structure is five bays wide, with a two-story pedimented portico spanning the three center bays.  It was added to National Register of Historic Places on January 29, 1987, as a part of the Plantersville Multiple Resource Area.

References

National Register of Historic Places in Dallas County, Alabama
Houses on the National Register of Historic Places in Alabama
Greek Revival houses in Alabama
Houses in Dallas County, Alabama
Houses completed in 1850